Alberto Leveau District is one of fourteen districts of the province San Martín in Peru.

References